Cognitive deficit is an inclusive term to describe any characteristic that acts as a barrier to the cognition process.

The term may describe
 deficits in overall intelligence (as with intellectual disabilities),
 specific and restricted deficits in cognitive abilities (such as in learning disorders like dyslexia),
 neuropsychological deficits (such as in attention, working memory or executive function),
 or it may describe drug-induced impairment in cognition and memory (such as that seen with alcohol, glucocorticoids, and the benzodiazepines.)

Cause
It usually refers to a durable characteristic, as opposed to altered level of consciousness, which may be acute and reversible. Cognitive deficits may be inborn or caused by environmental factors such as brain injuries, neurological disorders, or mental illness.

Screening
Screening for cognitive impairment in those over the age of 65 without symptoms is of unclear benefit versus harm as of 2020. In a large population-based cohort study included 579,710 66-year-old adults who were followed for a total of 3,870,293 person-years (average 6.68 ± 1.33 years per person), subjective cognitive decline was significantly associated with an increased risk of subsequent dementia.

Treatment
Older people with cognitive impairment appear to improve somewhat with light therapy.

Other findings 

Although one would expect cognitive decline to have major effects on job performance, it seems that there is little to no correlation of health with job performance.  With the exception of cognitive-dependent jobs such as air-traffic controller, professional athlete, or other elite jobs, age does not seem to impact one's job performance. This obviously conflicts with cognitive tests given, so the matter has been researched further.
One possible reason for this conclusion is the rare need for a person to perform at their maximum. There is a difference between typical functioning, that is – the normal level of functioning for daily life, and maximal functioning, that is – what cognitive tests observe as our maximum level of functioning. As the maximum cognitive ability that we are able to achieve decreases, it may not actually affect our daily lives, which only require the normal level.

Some studies have indicated that childhood hunger might have a protective effect on cognitive decline. One possible explanation is that the onset of age-related changes in the body can be delayed by calorie restriction. Another possible explanation is the selective survival effect, as the study participants who had a childhood with hunger tend to be the healthiest of their era.

See also 
 PASS Theory of Intelligence
 Fluid and crystallized intelligence

References

Further reading 
 
 Das, J.P. (2002). A better look at intelligence. Current Directions in Psychology, 11, 28–32.
 Goldstein, Gerald; Beers, Susan, eds (2004). Comprehensive Handbook of Psychological Assessment: Volume I: Intellectual and Neurological Assessment. Hoboken, NJ: John Wiley & Sons.
 
 
 Sattler, Jerome M. (2008). Assessment of Children: Cognitive Foundations. La Mesa (CA): Jerome M. Sattler, Publisher.

External links 

Cognition
Cognitive disorders
Developmental disabilities
Special education
Pediatrics